UFC Fight Night: Shields vs. Ellenberger (also known as UFC Fight Night 25 or UFC Fight Night: Battle on the Bayou) was a mixed martial arts event held by the Ultimate Fighting Championship on September 17, 2011 at the Ernest N. Morial Convention Center in New Orleans, Louisiana.

Background
The event was the seventh time that the organization has held an event in Louisiana and first since UFC 37 in 2002.

The event was the last UFC Fight Night aired on Spike, and in general, the last UFC Fight Night labeled event until the debut of Fox Sports 1 in 2013. After that, all UFC main cards on cable/satellite Fox channels would be labeled UFC Fight Night. And, in addition to cable/satellite Fox UFC events, most UFC Fight Pass main events would also be labeled UFC Fight Night.

Mackens Semerzier was expected to face Mike Lullo at the event, but pulled out of the event on August 31 and was replaced by Robbie Peralta

DaMarques Johnson was expected to face Clay Harvison at the event, but pulled out of the bout with an injury on August 31 and was replaced by Seth Baczynski.

Daniel Roberts was originally scheduled to face TJ Waldburger, but pulled out due to an injury and was replaced by Mike Stumpf.

The entire preliminary card was streamed on Facebook.

Results

Bonus awards
Fighters were awarded $55,000 bonuses.

 Fight of the Night: Matt Riddle vs. Lance Benoist
 Knockout of the Night: Jake Ellenberger
 Submission of the Night: TJ Waldburger

References

External links

UFC Fight Night
2011 in mixed martial arts
Mixed martial arts in New Orleans
MMA
2011 in sports in Louisiana
Events in New Orleans